This is a list of episodes from the French animated series, Zig & Sharko.

Series overview

Season 1 (2010–2011) 
Throughout the first season, much of the plots revolve around the oceans surrounding a tropical volcanic island, in which Marina often spends the day residing on a rocky pinnacle off the coast during the day, while residing in an underwater home that she shares with Sharko.

Season 2 (2016) 
In the second season, the plots shifted to the island itself, including its beaches, volcano, and jungle, with some changes for the main characters - Marina takes residence in an ornate, life-sized sandcastle, built by Sharko; Zig and Bernie live with a cargo plane pilot in his crashed plane within the jungle; and Sharko operates as a lifeguard for the aquatic lifeforms who frequent the beaches.

Season 3 (2019–2020) 
In the third season, the main characters and the island's inhabitants move onto a cruise ship to travel the oceans, where much of the season's plots take place.

Season 4 (2023) 
Zig & Sharko
A fourth season was announced in 2022.